Haggits Pillar is a stack  high in the South Pacific Ocean at the northwestern edge of the Ross Sea, lying  west of Scott Island and some  north-northeast of Cape Adare, Victoria Land, Antarctica.

It was discovered on 25 December 1902 by Captain William Colbeck, Royal Navy Reserve, commander of the SY Morning, relief ship to the British National Antarctic Expedition (BrNAE), 1901–1904, under Robert Falcon Scott. The name was used on official charts of the BrNAE drawn by Lieutenant George F.A. Mulock.

See also 
 Composite Antarctic Gazetteer
 List of Antarctic islands south of 60° S
 Scientific Committee on Antarctic Research
 Scott Island
 Territorial claims in Antarctica

References

Rock formations of the Ross Dependency
Stacks (geology)